The following is a list of Registered Historic Places in Ionia County, Michigan.



|}

See also

 List of Michigan State Historic Sites in Ionia County, Michigan
 List of National Historic Landmarks in Michigan
 National Register of Historic Places listings in Michigan
 Listings in neighboring counties: Barry, Clinton, Eaton, Gratiot, Kent, Montcalm

References

Ionia County
Ionia County, Michigan
Buildings and structures in Ionia County, Michigan